{{DISPLAYTITLE:C27H30O15}}
The molecular formula C27H30O15, molar mass: 594.52 g/mol, exact mass: 594.15847 u, may refer to:
 Kaempferol 3-O-rutinoside, a bitter-tasting flavonol glycoside
 Saponarin, a flavone glycoside
 Veronicastroside, a flavone glycoside

Molecular formulas